The spotfin goby cichlid (Tanganicodus irsacae) is an African species of cichlid endemic to Lake Tanganyika where it is only known from the northern end of the lake.  They live amongst pebbles in the surf-zone.  This species can reach a length of  TL.  This species can also be found in the aquarium trade. Although presently considered the only species in the genus, another undescribed species is known from the Lukuga River (Lake Tanganyika's outflow river).

Parasites

The monogenean Cichlidogyrus evikae, a gill parasite, has been described from the  spotfin goby cichlid.

References

Tanganicodus
Taxonomy articles created by Polbot
Fish described in 1950